John Sherman Billingsley (March 10, 1896 – October 4, 1966) was an American nightclub owner and former bootlegger who was the founder and owner of New York's Stork Club.

Life and career
John Sherman Billingsley was the youngest child of Robert Billingsley and Emily Collingsworth. He was born in Enid, Oklahoma, on March 10, 1896. (In later years, Billingsley said he was born in 1900, but this is refuted by both the 1930 census and the Social Security Death Index.) His parents had settled in Enid following the 1893 land run. The Billingsley children attended school in a one-room schoolhouse, riding a horse to get to school. When an older brother committed a homicide and was sent to prison, the family relocated to Anadarko to be near him. Upon the brother's release, he enlisted Sherman as an assistant in his bootlegging business.

The family moved again, this time to Oklahoma City, where Sherman was again drawn into the bootlegging business by another of his older brothers. This business extended into Omaha, Toledo, and Detroit.

In Detroit at age 18, Billingsley was arrested and convicted on federal charges. He was sentenced to 15 months in prison, and spent time in Leavenworth before his conviction was reversed. When his brother ran out on his Detroit mob partners, he left for New York, with Sherman joining him within a short time. Billingsley began buying drug stores in New York City and even started his own real estate office to help him acquire drug stores.

In 1929, he created the Stork Club, which he owned. From the time of the speakeasy until the 1960s, he held court on East 53rd Street. According to Ralph Blumenthal in his 2000 book, Stork Club, another New York nightclub owner named Mary Louise Cecilia Guinan, widely known as Texas Guinan, introduced Billingsley to her friend, commentator Walter Winchell, in 1930. In his column in the New York Daily Mirror, Winchell called the Stork Club "New York's New Yorkiest place on W. 58th".

One of Billingsley's mistresses in the late 1930s was actress Ethel Merman. His nephew, Glenn Billingsley, was married to Leave It to Beaver actress Barbara Billingsley. (The actress should not be confused with Sherman Billingsley's daughter Barbara, who like his other children, sometimes figured in publicity about the nightclub.)

Billingsley married Hazel Donnelly (1902-1991) on August 25, 1924, and they had three daughters, Jacqueline (Rorke, 1926-1998), Barbara (Mohler, ~1936-2010), and Shermane (age 77 as of 2022).

References

Bibliography
 Blumenthal, Ralph, Stork Club: America's Most Famous Nightspot and the Lost World of Café Society (Little, Brown and Company, 2000)  (hc);  (pb)

External links

1896 births
1966 deaths
Businesspeople from Oklahoma
Burials at Ferncliff Cemetery
Nightclub owners
American restaurateurs
Nightlife in New York City
Place of birth missing
Businesspeople from Enid, Oklahoma
20th-century American businesspeople